The Basilica of St. Severin is an early Romanesque basilica church located in the Südstadt of Cologne (Köln). The former collegiate church is dedicated to St. Severin of Cologne. It is one of the twelve Romanesque churches of Cologne.

St. Severin was established in the late 4th century as a memorial chapel and extended several times. The oldest parts of today's building date back to the 10th century. It was designated a Basilica Minor by Pope Pius XII in 1953.

See also 
 Twelve Romanesque churches of Cologne
 List of basilica churches in Germany
 Cologne Cathedral 
 German architecture
 Romanesque architecture
 List of regional characteristics of Romanesque churches 
 Romanesque secular and domestic architecture

References

External links  

 official site

Saint Severin
Saint Severin
Basilica churches in Germany
4th-century churches
Romanesque architecture in Germany